The Belize Athletic Association (BAA) is the governing body for the sport of athletics in Belize.

History
BAA was founded in 1956 as Belize Amateur Athletic Association (BAAA).  In 2013, the name was changed to Belize Athletic Association.

In August 2010, Ian Gray was elected as new president.  However, there was an ongoing internal dispute between board officials claiming the lead of BAAA leading to the executive been dissolved by the IAAF.  In October 2013, a new executive was elected with Hugh ”Pinas” Staine as new president.

Affiliations
BAA is the national member federation for Belize in the following international organisations:
International Association of Athletics Federations (IAAF)
North American, Central American and Caribbean Athletic Association (NACAC)
Association of Panamerican Athletics (APA)
Central American and Caribbean Athletic Confederation (CACAC)
Confederación Atlética del Istmo Centroamericano (CADICA; Central American Isthmus Athletic Confederation)
Moreover, it is part of the following national organisations:
Belize Olympic and Commonwealth Games Association

National records
BAA maintains the Belizean records in athletics.

External links
Facebook

References

Belize
Athletics
Athletics in Belize
1956 establishments in British Honduras
Sports organizations established in 1956
National governing bodies for athletics